("embryonic breathing" or "embryonic respiration") refers to Daoist meditation and  Inner Alchemy methods, the principle of which is to breathe like an embryo or fetus in the womb, without using nose or mouth.

Terminology
 is a linguistic compound of two common Chinese words:
 
fetus, embryo; womb; something encapsulated like a fetus.
embryonic, fetal; source, origin; e.g., (Daoism)  , embryonic breathing, technique of "pneuma circulation"   in which an adept breathes in stillness, without using nose or mouth, as when in the womb; early stage of development; something in an unfinished state.
give birth to; spawn; congenital. …

exhale; respiration, suspire, breathe ...
to desist from, give up; abate, pause, interrupt, suspend, rest; respite; "blow out," extinguish, put an end to; abandon, lose.
to comfort, calm, assuage; treat an illness; e.g., calm oneself, compose one's mind, be of tranquil mind; (Buddhism)  , "companion of the tranquil mind," translation of Sanskrit  one who has left passions behind, monk, religious ascetic. … (Kroll 2017: 440, 484; condensed) 

Chinese  can ambiguously be translated as English embryo, fetus, or womb.

Chinese  has various English translations.
"Embryonic Respiration" (Maspero 1981: 269)
"embryonic respiration" (Needham 1983: 147)
"embryo respiration" (Engelhardt 1989: 287)
"Embryonic Breathing" (Schipper 1993: 157)
"womb breathing" (Bokenkamp 1997: 315)
"embryonic respiration" or "womb breathing," (Campany 2002: 365)
"embryonic breathing" or "embryonic respiration" (Darga 2008: 884; Despeux 2016: 163)
"Womb Breathing" (Eskildsen 2008: 265)
"Embryonic Breathing" (Jia 2015: 26)
"embryonic breathing" (Pregadio 2018: 398)

Catherine Despeux explains how "womb respiration" or "womb breathing" can alternately translate , which refers to "a manner of respiration that does not involve the nose or the mouth but rather the pores of the skin." When adepts are said to "breathe like an embryo", this expression may also denote the sensation of "something expanding and contracting, or 'breathing' somewhere inside their bodies". And if the term  is read as "womb" or "matrix," then  takes on the sense of "womb respiration." This introspective sensation of expansion and contraction attributed to a breathing embryo is firmly situated in the lower  or lower abdomen, where the womb is located (2016: 163).

In Daoist textual terminology, one  ("inhalation; breathing in") and one  ("exhalation; breathing out") comprise one  ("respiratory cycle")—compare the common word  ("breath, breathing; inhalation and exhalation"). This presents an "obvious parallel with the conviction that there was vitality in certain secretions of the body so that all losses of them should be avoided." (Needham 1983: 143).

Ancient Theory of External Breaths 
Kristofer Schipper notes that, "embryonic breathing is not a late development in the breathing exercises, but has always existed under different names" (1993: 242). (Eskildsen 2015: 256).

The origins of the term embryonic breathing go back at least to the early centuries of the Common Era (Eskildsen 2015: 254). It records that Wang and He Mengjie were both from Shangdang (modern-day south and east Shanxi Province). Wang Zhen practiced "embryonic breathing [], 'embryonic eating [],' subsistence on his own saliva [], and incessant bedchamber arts"; while He Mengjie had the "capacity to go without eating and shut up his breath []." (tr. Campany 2002: 344; cf. Dewoskin 1983: 88, "methods of fetal breathing and fetal eating"; and Despeux 2008: 953, "were able to practice embryonic breathing and feed themselves like an embryo"). From this description of Wang Zhen, Eskildsen says, "it would appear as though the embryonic breathing method was perhaps not actually a breathing technique but rather a method of swallowing saliva. However, it could be that the swallowing technique described here constitutes only 'embryonic eating,' and that there was an accompanying breathing technique that constituted embryonic breathing but is not described." (2015: 254). Li Xian's c. 675 commentary to the Book of Later Han notes, "To practice breath holding and gulping it down [] is called , to practice coughing up saliva and swallowing it [] is called ." 

Both "embryonic fluid" and "pure water of the jade lake" refer to saliva, which is called the "water of life" and is supposed to prolong life. The Han people already practiced the method of swallowing saliva to improve the physique and nurture life (Jia 2015: 15).

The Daoist scholar Ge Hong's 318 CE  ("Master Who Embraces Simplicity") is described as "one of the major sources on breath control practices in pre-Tang China" (Sailey 1978: 341).  is mentioned in three of the esoteric  ("Inner Chapters").

Maspero 1981: 325; cf. Ware 1966: 54).

In Chapter 8 ("Resolving Hesitations"), Ge Hong praises embryonic breathing and tells a underwater breath-holding anecdote about his granduncle Ge Xuan (164–244), who was prominent in early Daoism and the first recipient of the Lingbao sacred scriptures. Ge Hong seems to have understood  as the culmination of long-term daily practice of  "pneuma circulation" (Campany 2002: 365). First, he describes  as a potent panacea and gives a detailed description of timing  breath-holding by counting heartbeats. 
By practising the circulation of the [] [ ] one can cure the hundred diseases, one can walk through the midst of plagues and epidemics, one can ward off snakes and tigers, stop bleeding from wounds, stay under water or walk across it, free oneself from hunger and thirst, and protract one's years. The most important thing is simply to (know how to) breathe like an embryo []. He who can breathe like a foetus [] will respire [ ] as if still in the womb [], without using nose or mouth; thus will the Tao be achieved. When one first begins to learn how to circulate the [], one must inhale through the nose and then close up that breath. While it is thus hidden within, one counts up to 120 heart-beats [∼ 90 seconds], and then exhales it (gently) through the mouth. Neither during exhalation nor inhalation should one hear with one's ears the sound of the breathing, and one should make sure that more goes in than comes out. A wild goose feather may be placed in front of the nose and mouth, and during exhalation this should not show any movement. After continual practice one may very gradually increase the number of heart-beats (during which the breath is held) to as much as 1000 [∼ 12 minutes 30 seconds], and when this proficiency is reached, an old man will be able to grow younger daily, returning [ ] to youth by one day every day. (tr. Needham 1983: 143-144) 
Compare Ware's translation, "The most important part of it is simply to breathe like a fetus. He who succeeds in doing this will do his breathing as though in the womb, without using nose or mouth, and for him the divine Process has been achieved." (1966: 138). Second, in a context about how few people can successfully practice the art of breath circulation, Ge again mentions his granduncle. "My ancestral uncle [Ge Xuan], whenever he was overcome by wine in the heat of the summer would incontinently retire to the bottom of a deep pool and stay there till the evening—this was because he could retain his breath [ ] and respire like a foetus in the womb []." (tr. Needham 1983: 142; cf. Ware 1966: 140 "to hoard his breaths and breathe like a fetus"). The fetal condition "was considered worth reverting to because doing so was thought to constitute a reversal of the aging process and a restoration to the condition that existed when your vital forces had not yet begun to be expended." (Eskildsen 2015: 255).

 also occurs in one of the exoteric   ("Outer Chapters"): "It is like 'embryonic-breathing-in-which-the-Mystery-is-preserved' []. In deep breathing we throw out the old and take in the new, retaining the vista and looking inwards." (14, tr. Sailey 1978: 65). The translator Sailey interpreted the  practice of "breathing as in the embryo, … a kind of very deep breathing with both the nose and the mouth enabling one to achieve a state analogous to that of a foetus in a womb." (1978: 341)

Two repeat the above  phrase  ("embryonic breathing and embryonic eating"). The Wang Zhen hagiography quotes the  description of his "embryonic breathing, 'embryonic eating', subsistence on his own saliva" (tr. Campany 2002: 344). The Ji Liao or Ji Zixun entry has two consecutive sentences, where Campany compared sources (2002: 412) and omitted the first "Because he proclaimed methods of embryonic breathing, embryonic eating, stopping aging, and turning white hair black again" [] and translated the second "In over two hundred years his countenance did not age." (2002: 169).

The other two  hagiographies mention  in the phrase  ("embryonic breathing and inner visualization"). The entry for Huang Jing records that "he is said to have circulated pneumas, abstained from grains, subsisted on his saliva, practiced embryonic breathing and interior vision" [] (tr. Campany 2002: 541). The hagiography for Huang Hua or Jiuling zi says "He obtained Ways of turning back the years, banishing aging, and fetal breathing []" (tr. Campany 2002: 365).

The c. 4th-5th century CE  ("Classic of the Great Peace") biography of the Daoist  Zhou Yishan says: "Every morning after dawn, when the sun was rising, he stood up straight facing due east, and having rinsed out his mouth, swallowed (much) saliva, then he absorbed the  [ ] more than a hundred times. This being done he turned towards the sun and saluted it twice. And every morning he repeated these procedures." (tr. Needham 1983: 143). The air "must be inhaled slowly through the nose, held for as long as possible, and finally exhaled through the mouth" (Maspero 1981: 462). 

The  also ranks the importance of strict dieting for adepts practicing embryonic respiration, "In the first place feed upon airy breath [ ]; in the second place feed upon drugs; in the third place eat little." The best diets, thus, were those that dispensed with all solid food; either feeding upon saliva, or upon air. The first method was called "Embryonic Nourishment" ("swallowing saliva") with a name paralleling "Embryonic Respiration". The second was called "Feeding upon Breath" (  or  ) or "Feeding by Respiration" (Maspero 1981: 338).

Side effects

Although the  says that Ge Xuan could hold his breath underwater all afternoon, even allowing for typical hagiographic exaggeration, attempting extreme  ("breath-holding") could be dangerous for  embryonic respiration practitioners.

According to the French sinologist Henri Maspero, Daoists believed that learning to hold one's breath for a long time extends the opportunity to feed upon it. Commenting on the legend that Liu Gen supposedly held his breath for three days before becoming a transcendent, "But what a long effort it takes to attain such mastery! The practise of 'holding the breath in' is painful; it brings on all sorts of physiological difficulties, which the Adept has to surmount little by little." (1981: 270). Sometimes when an adept holds their breath for too long, "beads of sweat form and the head and feet become heated: this is because the breath is passing through them", and at other times from the strain of "holding the breath firmly, after some time, the belly aches." (1981: 464). In traditional Chinese beliefs, respiration is closely associated with digestion and circulation. An adept who practices Embryonic Respiration "in a perfect fashion has no need for ordinary food" because they have "realized the Taoist ideal of 'Feeding upon Breath'" (  or  ). Feeding upon Breath could never have been more than a temporary diet; "for if it had been followed too long, death—or, if one wishes to express it in the Taoist way, the Liberation of the Corpse—would have occurred so regularly with the beginning of this practice that it would make the Adepts think again, and cause them to abandon so dangerous a procedure." (Maspero 1981: 343).

Daoist technical terms for breath-holding used the word  ("Chinese classifier for actions"); a "small"  was 12 respiratory cycle suppressions [∼ 36 seconds], and a "large"  was 120 [∼ 6 minutes]. Joseph Needham imagines that "serious and painful effort was required", and quotes Sun Simiao's c. 652  ("Essential Formulas [Worth] a Thousand Pieces of Gold"): "'At the end of 300 respiratory cycles [~ 15 minutes], the ears have no hearing left, the eyes see no more, the mind can no longer think; then one must stop holding the breath." (tr. Needham 1983: 144).

This breath-holding technique produced considerable hypoxemia (insufficient oxygen in the blood) with its strange effects, "buzzing in the ears, vertigo, perspiration, sensations of heat and formication in the extremities, fainting and headache." Furthermore, if Daoist breath-holding was practiced in temples on high mountains, it could result in chronic mountain sickness, with symptoms of "headache, dizziness, tinnitus, breathlessness, palpitations, sleep disturbance, fatigue, confusion, cyanosis, and notably loss of appetite." This could have made the delimited diet of the recluses easier to bear, "contributing as it did in its turn to the reduction of cardiac strain and heightened awareness and well-being consequent on loss of all excess body-weight" (1983: 145).
Perhaps what happened was that the pre-[T]ang idea of the circulation of the [] gradually came to be more emphasized at the expense of the breath-holding—which might indeed have led to certain accidents just as the metallic elixirs did—and thus the breathing became secondary to an imaginative voluntary circulation of the [] of the internal organs, with the idea that the more this was done the more the [] of primary vitality would be re-formed. This was a significant conceptual expansion, for the "essences" of all the organs were now emphasized as valuable, not only the saliva (from the lungs) and the semen (from the reins); and it did embody the truth that all the organs contribute their products to the blood-stream. This inner round, it was thought, corresponded with the respiratory cycle though not part of it; when the external [] came upwards to be exhaled, the internal [] also came up from the lowest region of vital heat [], and when the air went down into the lungs in inspiration so also the internal [] pursued a downward path. The expression [ , with  "ingest; consume (esp. medicine)"] is now increasingly supplemented by the phrase [ , with  "swallow; gulp"], a more specific term for swallowing; this was one process and the circulation was another. (Needham 1983: 147-148)

Tang Theory of Internal Breaths 

In what Joseph Needham called "an important turning-point" in the history of  embryonic breathing, Henri Maspero revealed that "a great change which came over respiratory technology (if we might so call it)" towards the middle of the Tang dynasty (618-907) (1983: 147). Daoist priests realized that breath circulation was not specifically Daoist, since the practice was common in traditional Chinese medicine and Chinese Buddhism."They discovered then that the men of old had interpreted the books wrongly, and that Embryonic Respiration was something else" (Maspero 1981: 465).

Xue Yannian (1252-1313) quotes the c. 664  ("Scripture of Cavern Abyss") about the new Tang theory of two breaths. The  external breath, which when "dispersed, is like a cloud of smoke and, gathered together, is like hair, which is seen on the skin, which has the five colors, green, red, yellow, white, and black." The  internal breath of a person "comes from the Cinnabar Field, his breathing is deep; what it nourishes is distant, what it emits is thick. In ordinary people, […] it "rises from the liver and the diaphragm: they breathe like monkeys and puff like rats." (tr. Maspero 1981: 465)

The c. 745  ("Scripture on New and Old Methods for the Ingestion of Breath Collected by the Elder of Yanling", below) defines the technique: "One must carefully pull the breath while inspiring and expiring so that the Original Breath does not exit the body. Thus, the outer and inner breaths do not mix and one achieves embryonic breathing." (tr. Despeux 2008: 953).

The Daoist and Buddhist literature on embryonic breathing expanded during the Tang and the early Song dynasty (960–1279) periods.

The  ("Scripture of Embryonic Breathing"), a.k.a. (the Exalted Jade Sovereign's Scripture on Embryonic Breathing), is a brief text of 88 characters that dates from circa 755 (Needham 1983: 385).
The womb is formed from within the subdued . The  breathes from the inside of where there is a womb. When  enters the body, you live because of this. When the spirit leaves the body, you die because of this. When the spirit goes, the  goes. When the spirit stays, the  stays. If you want to live long, spirit and  must concentrate on one another. If your mind does not give rise to thoughts, it will not come and go. Not leaving and entering, it naturally constantly stays. To diligently practice this is the true road. (tr. Eskildsen 2015: 258; cf. Huang 1990: 41-44) 
Compare Frederic H. Balfour's early English translation: "The Embryo is formed by the concretion of concealed Breath; and the Embryo being brought into existence, the Breath begins to move in Respiration. The entrance of Breath into the body is Life; the departure of the Spirit from the external form is Death." (1884: 63).

The Tang  ("Commentary on the Scripture of Embryonic Breathing") is found in three versions of the Daoist Canon, two of which are accompanied by a commentary, and one attributes the text to Huanzhen Xiansheng (late 9th century?) (Eskildsen 2015: 257). The  explains that practicing Embryonic Breathing will enable one to keep the  Primordial Qi, have  gods enter the body, and thus to attain immortality (Baldrian-Hussein 2004a: 367). For instance, this commentary explains the first  sentence. 
The sea of breath lies three inches below the navel. It is also (called) the lower [] (the elixir field.) It is also (called) the dark female [ ]. People usually say that [] is the mouth and the nose. That is wrong. The mouth and the nose are the entering and exiting doors for []. The word [] means (also) water, and the word [] means mother. It is known in the world that the Yin and Yang breaths meet and coagulate, (originating) from a (father's) water (sperm) and a mother. It becomes an embryo within three months. The form is completed in ten months and has become a human being. Those who are practicing the nourishing way [], store the breath beneath the navel and keep their soul inside their body. Soul and breath combine together and produce the mysterious embryo. Once the mysterious embryo is conceived, it will produce a body by itself. This is the inner elixir and the way [] of nondeath. (tr. Huang 1990: 41).

The Tang  ("Songs and Instructions on the Secret Essentials of Embryonic Breathing") explains breathing techniques, proper diet, avoiding foods, and self-cultivation. It begins:
BLOCKING THE BREATH. If you suddenly have a disease that does not involve an injury, gather up your mind and go to a room where you can be at ease. Take off your clothes and lie down on your back on the bed and hold your fists tight. Tap your teeth (often) and burn incense. After you have swallowed 36 swallowings (and done the corresponding blockings) of the breath, the breath in the elixir field will exceed what is normally there. Use your mind to guide it to where you feel the ailment. That is the best way. When perspiration appears, it is the sign to stop. Do not do it in excess so you may reap the best benefits. (tr. Huang 1990: 47) 
This brief text about  absorption of discusses dietetics, sexual hygiene, and the otherwise-unknown  (Six Qi) exercises to be practiced in times of illness (Baldrian-Hussein 2004b: 367).

It describes the  method as equivalent with absorbing the  Inner Breath through holding the breath and swallowing saliva seven times (Baldrian-Hussein 2004c: 373).

The  is produced from the breathing of the womb. (tr. Eskildsen 2015: 264). Thus, whether the  will either stay inside to form a womb or exit the body, is contingent upon the purity or turbidity of the  itself, which the text does not explain.

The text is divided into nine sections ("essays; discourses"), describing the consecutive steps toward attaining purificatioin and longevity. Some editions only have the first two (Baldrian-Hussein 2004d: 374).
"On the Five Sprouts". Adepts ingest them, while swallowing saliva and reciting invocations, with the help of visualization, gradually substituting them for a regular diet.
"On the Ingestion of Breath". Several methods are given to become independent of ordinary breathing, adepts first absorb  as breath, then guide it internally, and store it in their inner organs. 
"On ". They frequently emulate the movements of animals, serve to make the body supple, harmonize the inner energies, stimulate blood circulation, and expel diseases. Gymnastics should always be followed by self-massage.
"On Talismanic Water". Daoist talismans are sacred characters written on paper, which is burnt and the ashes dissolved in water, finally ingested by the adepts. Talisman water is commonly used to avoid hunger and thirst when fasting.
"On Taking Drugs". This section warns against the dangers of prolonged abstention from normal food, especially the Five Grains, which are replaced by drugs containing . Several prescriptions are given to strengthen adepts beginning  absorption when they are weakened by the radical changes in diet.
"On Complying with Prohibitions". During the practice of  absorption, one should avoid exerting the body and any intense emotional states.
"On the Five Viscera". Relying heavily on the medical classic , this is a physiological description of Five Viscera/Orbs, and their correspondences with the Five Planets and Five Sacred Mountains.
"On Healing Disease through Ingestion of Breath". Diseases, resulting from bad energy circulation, hinder progress. There are specific exercises to heal them, massages or gymnastics cure external problems, while  absorption heals diseases affecting the internal organs.
"On the Symptoms of Diseases". Prior to proper  practice even latent diseases must be eliminated. Methods are thus given to diagnose harmful tendencies at an early stage (Englehardt 1989: 272-277; Kohn 2008: 431).

The second section is the longest one and of central importance to embryonic breathing. Adepts begin by absorbing the above  (Great Clarity Talisman for [Facilitating]  Circulation), which enables one to gradually abstain from eating grains. They then ingest  by visualizing the first rays of the rising sun, guide it through the body and viscera, until they can permanently "retain the ". Sima Chengzhen points out that when one begins abstaining from foods and survives only by ingesting  breath (and repeats this warning for taking drugs), the immediate effect will be undergoing a phase of weakening and decay, but eventually strength returns all illnesses vanish. (Englehardt 1989: 273).

The  ("Instructions of the Perfected Person on the Divine Operation of the Sacred Embryo") text attributes embryonic breathing methods to divinities like Laozi and Lishan Laomu; to semilegendary characters such as Bodhidharma, Zhang Guolao, Guiguzi, and Liu Haichan; to historical characters like Ge Hong and Chen Tuan; and to female adepts like He Xiangu (Despeux 2008: 954).

The preface to the Tang-era  ("Oral Explanation of Embryonic Respiration") abundantly explains the central role of emulating the fetus, navel, and belly.
That which is in the womb is called foetus, that which has been born is called child. As long as the foetus is in the abdomen of the mother, its mouth is filled with a kind of mud [ ], and respiration [ ] does not penetrate there; it is through the navel (and the umbilical cord) that it receives (lit.   "swallows") the [], and the nourishment for its bodily form. Thus it is that it arrives at its completion. Hence we know that the umbilicus [ ] is the 'gate of destiny' [ ]. Most babies, if they are alive at birth, fail for a short time to breathe in (the external air), but when the umbilical cord [ ] near the belly, is dipped into warm water three to five times, the infant 'resuscitates' (and breathes). So indeed we know that the umbilicus is the 'gate of destiny', no mistake about it. All those who wish to practise the Tao of reversion [ ] and to attain embryonic respiration must first know the source and origin of this, then they can do it themselves, breathing like the foetus in the mother's abdomen. Hence the name (of the technique). It is in reverting to the origin [ ] and regenerating the primary vitalities [ ] that old age can be chased away, and that one can return to the state of the foetus. Truly there is a point in this (exercise). Softly, gently, without holding the breath, that is the way to bring about the germination of the Tao of immortality. (Needham 1983: 145-146; cf. Maspero 1981: 459-460) 
This all fitted together very reasonably. Understanding that the mammalian embryo "breathes" through the placenta and the maternal circulation as well as gaining its nourishment, its food materials, through the same route, was an "excellent piece of early biological observation, as also the awareness of the occlusion of the foetal intestinal tract by the meconium". Adepts who would recreate in themselves into the youthful perfection of the embryonic tissues must also cease mouth breathing. "The subsequent insistence on the swallowing of saliva was also reasonable, as it could help to re-create the aquatic environment of the mammalian foetus" (Needham 1983: 146).

Li Fengshi's late 8th-century  ("Mr. Grand-Nothingness of Sung Mountain's Manual of  [Circulation]") stresses the importance of oral tradition.
The most important techniques of Taoism are not to be found in the books but rather in the instructions orally transmitted. The procedures of absorbing the [] described in the two Manuals of the Yellow Courts, with those called the "five ya ["sprouts"]" [ ] and the "six mou" [ ] all have to do only with the external [] (of the air). But the [] of the external world is hard and powerful; it is not something coming from the interior (of the body), and so no benefit is to be gained by absorbing it. As for the internal [], that indeed is what can be called (the breath of) "embryonic respiration" []; it exists naturally within (the body), it is not something which one has to go outside to borrow. But if one does not obtain the personal explanations of an enlightened teacher, all one's efforts will be but labour and sorrow, and one will never succeed in one's objective. (tr. Needham 1983: 147) 
The contents of this work can be grouped under three headings: respiratory practices, dietary regimens and general recommendations, and the theory of Embryonic Breathing (Lévi 2004: 371),

There were two ways of making it circulate [ ]. Concentrating the will to direct it to a particular place, such as the brain, or the site of some local malady, was termed [ ]. Visualising its flow in thought was "inner vision" [ ,  ], differentiated (not very convincingly to us) from ordinary imagination. "Closing one's eyes, one has an inner vision of the five viscera, one can clearly distinguish them, one knows the place of each…" (Needham 1983: 148) 

Based on texts like this, Needham proposes that "anatomical demonstrations may have taken place from time to time in the Taoist temples, and of course all possible parts of the domesticated mammals were eaten, so that there could have been much familiarity with their visceral and vascular system." The passive method of letting the  take its normal course in circulating, was called  ("casting it"). Thus, the ancient retention of the breath was not entirely given up, but incorporated into the whole system of employing  [ ]. (1983: 148).

 practices continue in modern times. Hsuan Hua (1918-1995), a Chinese monk of Chan Buddhism taught that the external breathing reaches a state of stillness in correct meditation:
A practitioner with sufficient skill does not breathe externally. That external breathing has stopped, but the internal breathing functions. With internal breathing there is no exhalation through the nose or mouth, but all pores on the body are breathing. A person who is breathing internally appears to be dead, but actually he has not died. He does not breathe externally, but the internal breathing has come alive. (Hsuan 2004: 44).

Interpretations 
Sinologists have varyingly interpreted the principles behind  embryonic breathing practices.

Mircea Eliade said Chinese embryonic respiration was not like Indian yogic , "an exercise preliminary to meditation, nor an auxiliary technique, but sufficed in itself [...] to set in motion and bring to completion a 'mystical physiology'." (1958: 71).

According to Jay Sailey, "The philosophical basis of the practice is simple enough: since while a man breathes he is alive, and when he stops breathing his life comes to an end, it is reasoned that is one could increase his intake of air and limit its outgo, then he could increase his lifespan." (1978: 340-341).

Joseph Needham proposes that embryonic breathing techniques likely began with the observation that air was necessary for life, "and perhaps the idea that the more closely one could hug it to oneself the more it would contribute to life—thought of in our terms, it was as if by long retention of the inhaled air one could store an infinite abundance of oxygen. Air was clearly a highly vivifying agent for the mortal body—therefore (by ancient logic) it followed that if only one knew what to do with it the body could be made immortal. After all, before modern physiology, this was not so illogical." (1983: 142). He also says this "purposive" apnea (temporary cessation of breathing) was "accompanied by an interesting theory" of  "embryonic respiration". However, the Daoist embryonic respiration system involved a physiological fallacy, "no retention of the air could compensate for the absence of a placenta in the adult". Nevertheless, the mistaken  theory persisted for centuries, and early  commentators described "reducing respiration to its utmost softness and imperceptibility". (1983: 145-146). Needham concluded that "The circulation-mindedness of traditional Chinese physiological thought, so much in advance of the rest of the world, however archaic in form" is always worth emphasizing." (1983: 146).

See also
, mindfulness of breathing in Buddhist meditation
Inedia, or breatharianism claims that a person can live without consuming food, and sometimes water
, breath retention in  yoga
,  breathing exercises with Six Healing Sounds
Womb Realm, Mandala of the Five Tathāgatas

References
Baldrian-Hussein, Farzeen (2004a), "Taixi jing zhu ," in Schipper and Verellen 2004: 366-367. 
Baldrian-Hussein, Farzeen (2004b)," in Schipper and Verellen 2004: 367. 
Baldrian-Hussein, Farzeen (2004c), "Taixi jingwei lun ," in Schipper and Verellen 2004: 372-373.
Baldrian-Hussein, Farzeen (2004d), "Fuqi jingyi lun ," in Schipper and Verellen 2004: 373-374.
Balfour, Frederic (1894), "The T'ai-hsi King; or the Respiration of the Embryo," in Taoist Texts, Ethical, Political, and Speculative, Trübner and Co, 63-65.
Bokenkamp, Stephen R. (1997), Early Daoist Scriptures, with a contribution by Peter Nickerson, University of California Press.
Campany, Robert Ford (2002), To Live as Long as Heaven and Earth: A Translation and Study of Ge Hong's Traditions of Divine Transcendents, University of California Press.
Darga, Martina (2008), "Shengtai  Embryo of Sainthood; Sacred Embryo", in Fabrizio Pregadio (ed.), The Encyclopedia of Taoism, Routledge, 883-884.
Despeux, Catherine (2008), "Taixi  embryonic breathing," in Fabrizio Pregadio (ed.), The Encyclopedia of Taoism, Routledge, 953-954.
Despeux, Catherine (2016), "Symbolic pregnancy and the sexual identity of Taoist adepts", in Anna Andreeva and Dominic Steavu (eds.), Transforming the Void. Embryological Discourse and Reproductive Imagery in East Asian Religions, Brill, 147-185.
DeWoskin, Kenneth J. and James Irving Crump, (1996), In Search of the Supernatural: The Written Record, Stanford University Press.
DeWoskin, Kenneth J. (1983), Doctors, Diviners, and Magicians of Ancient China; Biographies of Fang-Shih, Columbia University Press.
Eliade, Mircea (1958), Yoga, immortality and freedom, tr. by Willard K. Trask, Routledge and Kegan Paul.
Engelhardt, Ute (1989)," for Life: Longevity in the T'ang," in Kohn, Livia Taoist Meditation and Longevity Techniques, 263-296.
Engelhardt, Ute (2000), "Longevity Techniques and Chinese Medicine," in Kohn Daoism Handbook, E. J. Brill, 74-108.
Eskildsen, Stephen (2015), Daoism, Meditation, And the Wonders of Serenity – From the Latter Han Dynasty (25-220) to the Tang Dynasty (618-907), SUNY Press.
Espesset, Gregoire (2009), "Latter Han religious mass movements and the early Daoist church", in John and Marc Kalinowski (eds.), Early Chinese Religion, Part One: Shang through Han (1250 BC–220 AD), Brill, 1061-1102.
Greatrex, Roger, tr. (1987), The Bowu Zhi: An Annotated Translation, Föreningen för Orientaliska Studier - Stockholm University. 
Hsuan Hua (2004), The Chan Handbook: Talks about Meditation, Buddhist Text Translation Society.
Huang, Jane (1998), The Primordial Breath: An Ancient Chinese Way of Prolonging Life through Breath Control, revised ed., 2 vols., Original Books.
Jia Jinhua (2015), "Longevity Technique and Medicine Theory: The Legacy of the Tang Daoist Priestess-Physician Hu Yin", Monumenta Serica: Journal of Oriental Studies 63.1: 1–31.
Kohn, Livia (2008), "Fuqi jingyi lun, Essay on the Essential Meaning of the Ingestion of Breath", in Fabrizio Pregadio (ed.), The Encyclopedia of Taoism, Routledge, 431-432.
Lévi, Jean (2004), " ", in Schipper and Verellen 2004: 370-371.
Mair, Victor H., tr. (1994), Wandering on the Way, Early Taoist Tales and Parables of Chuang Tzu, Bantam.
Maspero, Henri (1981), Taoism and Chinese Religion, tr. by Frank A. Kierman, University of Massachusetts Press.
Needham, Joseph and Lu Gwei-djen (1983), Science and Civilisation in China: Volume 5, Part 5, Chemistry and Chemical Technology Spagyrical Discovery and Invention: Physiological Alchemy, Cambridge University Press.
Sailey, Jay (1978),The Master Who Embraces Simplicity: A study of the philosopher Ko Hung, A.D. 283-343, Chinese Materials Center.
Schipper, Kristofer M. (1993), The Taoist Body, tr. Karen C. Duval, University of California Press.
Schipper, Kristofer and Franciscus Verellen (2004), The Taoist canon: a historical companion to the Daozang, Vol. 1 Antiquity through the Middle Ages, University of Chicago Press.
Ware, James R., tr. (1966), Alchemy, Medicine and Religion in the China of A.D. 320: The Nei Pien of Ko Hung, Dover.

External links
,  ("Commentary on the Scripture of Embryonic Breathing"), Wikisource edition.
,  ("Essay on the Subtlety of Embryonic Breathing"), Wikisource.
,  ("Songs and Instructions on the Secret Essentials of Embryonic Breathing"), Wikisource.

Meditation 
Taoist practices
Traditional Chinese medicine